Dithyrea (shieldpod) is a small genus of flowering plants in the family Brassicaceae containing only one or two species. The California shieldpod or spectacle-pod, Dithyrea californica, is an abundant and unique-looking herb native to the southwestern United States and northern Mexico. The beach shieldpod, Dithyrea maritima, a rare plant found only on the coast of California and Baja California, is sometimes considered a subspecies of D. californica.

References

External links

Jepson Manual Treatment
USDA Plants Profile
Photo gallery: Dithyrea californica

Brassicaceae
Brassicaceae genera
Flora of California